lzop is a free software file compression tool which implements the LZO algorithm and is licensed under the GPL.

Aimed at being very fast, lzop produces files slightly larger than gzip while only requiring a tenth of the CPU use and only slightly higher memory utilization. lzop is one of the fastest compressors available, a close second to lz4.

See also

List of archive formats
List of file archivers
Comparison of file archivers

References

External links

Free data compression software